Among the notable people from Lake Charles, Louisiana are:

Mark Abraham, state representative for Calcasieu Parish, effective 2016
Lynda Benglis, sculptor, born in Lake Charles
G. Lawrence Blankinship Sr., (1913–2005), civic leader and African-American businessman
Caroline Boudreaux, businesswoman and social entrepreneur
Terry Burrows, Major League Baseball pitcher; played for the Texas Rangers, Milwaukee Brewers and San Diego Padres
Edward M. Carmouche (1921–1990), chairman of the Louisiana Democratic Party, 1966–1968; ally of U.S. President Lyndon B. Johnson
Christopher Catrambone (b. 1981), Businessman and Humanitarian, founder of Migrant Offshore Aid Station
A. C. Clemons (1921–1992), trucking executive in Jefferson Davis Parish; first Republican member of the Louisiana State Senate since Reconstruction
Casey Daigle, baseball pitcher in the Houston Astros organization; husband of softball star Jennie Finch; graduated from Sulphur High School
Mike Danahay, Democratic state representative for Calcasieu Parish since 2008; sales representative in Lake Charles; graduate of McNeese State University
Alvin Dark, World Series champion baseball shortstop and manager
Michael E. DeBakey, heart surgeon; first person to successfully implant an artificial heart (1963); member of the Health Care Hall of Fame; recipient of the United Nations Lifetime Achievement Award, the Presidential Medal of Freedom with Distinction, and the National Medal of Science; originator of the M.A.S.H. unit concept; born in Lake Charles; graduate of Lake Charles High School
William Dore, businessman
Andre Dubus, author and essayist; born in Lake Charles; educated at McNeese State University
Joe Dumars, former player and current general manager for the Detroit Pistons; played for McNeese State University before going on to have a successful NBA career; named MVP of the 1989 NBA finals; elected to the Basketball Hall of Fame in 2006
Stephen Dwight, incoming Republican member of the Louisiana House for District 35
David Filo, billionaire; born in Wisconsin but raised partly in Moss Bluff; co-creator of the Internet portal Yahoo!
Sean Patrick Flanery, actor; starred in The Boondock Saints and The Dead Zone television series; born in Lake Charles
Ray Fontenot, Major League Baseball pitcher, 1983–1986, for the New York Yankees, Chicago Cubs, and Minnesota Twins
Terry Fontenot, general manager of the Atlanta Falcons
Matt Forte, starting running back and 2nd round-pick of the Chicago Bears; MVP of the 2008 Senior Bowl
Lether Frazar, president of McNeese State University; Lieutenant Governor of Louisiana under Earl Kemp Long, 1956–1960; namesake of the McNeese library
Dominic Gorie, astronaut from Lake Charles
Johnnie Gray, retired NFL safety, played for the Green Bay Packers
Paul Groves, opera singer
Ha*Ash, American pop country duo composed of sisters Hanna Nicole (b. 1985) and Ashley Grace (b. 1987)
Nickie Hall, former professional athlete in the Canadian Football League.
Trey Quinn, professional athlete with the Jacksonville Jaguars of the NFL
Tommy Mason, former professional football player, first overall pick of 1961 NFL Draft by the Minnesota Vikings
Mike Heinen, professional golfer; has played on the PGA Tour and Nationwide Tour; former winner of the PGA Shell Houston Open
Bob Hilton, host of game shows including Truth or Consequences; briefly the announcer for The Price is Right; began his career at KPLC TV
Harry Hollins, state representative for Calcasieu Parish, 1964–1980
Brian Johnson, champion track-and-field athlete; college coach
Ralph Waldo Emerson Jones (b. 1905), president and baseball coach at Grambling State University, 1936–1977; born in Lake Charles
Sam Houston Jones (b. 1897), Assistant Parish Prosecutor in Lake Charles for nine years before defeating Earl Kemp Long; governor of Louisiana in 1940; born in Merryville, Louisiana; died in 1978 in Lake Charles, where he is interred at Prien Pines Cemetery
Eddie Kennison, retired NFL player, active 1996–2008; graduated from Washington-Marion High School
Jesse Knowles, businessman, civic leader, state legislator representing Calcasieu Parish; survivor of the World War II Bataan Death March
 Tony Kushner, Pulitzer Prize-winning playwright
Zachary Levi, actor, title character in the NBC series Chuck; born in Lake Charles
Nellie Lutcher, jazz singer, gained some national popularity in the late 1940s and 50s; recorded for Capitol Records
Ted Lyons, baseball Hall of Famer who pitched for the Chicago White Sox; born in Lake Charles
Willie Mount, mayor of Lake Charles (1993–1999)
Mike Murdock, singer-songwriter, televangelist and pastor
Chad Ogea (b. 1970), pitcher, Major League Baseball (1994–1999), for the Cleveland Indians and Philadelphia Phillies, best known for his performance in the 1997 World Series
Van Dyke Parks, Mississippi-born composer, singer, musician, and actor; grew up in Lake Charles
 Rupert Richardson (1930-2008), African-American civil rights activist and civil rights leader who served as president of the National Association for the Advancement of Colored People (NAACP) from 1992 to 1995.
Eddie Shuler, founder of Goldband Records; recorded swamp pop, Cajun, and other genres of southern music
Al Simpson, 1998 Professional Putters Association Hall of Fame inductee.
Victor T. "Vic" Stelly (1941-2020), former state representative; author of the Stelly Plan
Justin Vincent, former professional football player in the NFL.
 Donald Ellsworth Walter, U.S. District Judge for the United States District Court for the Western District of Louisiana; U.S. attorney for the Western District 1969–1977, based in Shreveport; attorney formerly in private practice in Lake Charles
George H. Wells (1833–1905), Northern-born Confederate States of America officer; practiced law in Lake Charles; served in the Louisiana State Senate, 1878–1880
Lucinda Williams, singer-songwriter born in Lake Charles; recorded the song "Lake Charles" about Clyde Woodward, a boyfriend of hers born in Nacogdoches, Texas, who nevertheless told everybody that he was from Lake Charles
Ken Winey, (born 1962) former professional athlete in the Canadian Football League.

References

Lake Charles, Louisiana
Lake Charles
Lake Charles, Louisiana